Chaetosciadium is a monotypic genus of flowering plants in the family Apiaceae. Its only species is Chaetosciadium trichospermum. the only species of the genus Chaetosciadium. It is native to Iraq, Lebanon, Syria, Palestine and Saudi Arabia. It is common in Israel.

References 

Monotypic Apiaceae genera
Apiaceae
Taxa named by Pierre Edmond Boissier